The Lorenzhorn is a mountain of the Lepontine Alps, located west of Hinterrhein in the canton of Graubünden. It lies on the range between the valleys of Vals and Hinterrhein. On its north side lies a glacier named Fanellgletscher.

References

External links 
 Lorenzhorn on Hikr

Mountains of the Alps
Alpine three-thousanders
Mountains of Switzerland
Mountains of Graubünden
Lepontine Alps
Rheinwald